Sir Thomas Gerard, 2nd Baronet (c. 1584 - 15 May 1630) was an English landowner and politician who sat in the House of Commons in 1624.

Gerard was the son of Sir Thomas Gerard, 1st Baronet of Bryn and of Etwall and his wife Cecily Maney, daughter of Sir Walter Maney, of Staplehurst. He succeeded to the baronetcy on the death of his father in February 1621. In 1624, he was elected Member of Parliament for Liverpool. 
 
Gerard died in 1630 at the age of about 45.

Sir Thomas married Frances Molyneux, daughter of Sir Richard Molyneux, 1st Baronet of Sefton in about 1610. They had a son, William, who became third Baronet and died 7 April 1681.

References

1580s births
1630 deaths
English MPs 1624–1625
Baronets in the Baronetage of England
English landowners
Members of the Parliament of England (pre-1707) for Liverpool